Capo FC, also known as Capistrano FC is an American soccer club based in San Juan Capistrano, California.

History
Capo FC was founded in 2006 with the mission of developing the youth soccer in the southern part of Orange County, California. The team competes locally in the SoCal Premier League, as part of the SWPL.

In June 2020, the team was accepted in the United Premier Soccer League with plans to begin play in Division 1 for the Fall 2020 season. Following a delay, Capo debuted in Spring 2021 and went on to win the SoCal South championship. The team was promoted to the Premier Division for Fall 2021 where it finished the regular season undefeated in the SoCal North Conference.

On November 30, 2021, the club announced it would join NISA Nation as members of its brand new Southwest Region.

Capo was announced as a new member of USL League Two in December 2022, with plans to begin play the following season.

Year-by-year

References

External links
 

USL League Two teams
Soccer clubs in California
2006 establishments in California
Association football clubs established in 2006